Leverne Ann McDonnell (27 June 1963 – 15 March 2013) was an Australian actress.

Biography
McDonnell spent three years as a member of "Energy Connection", a youth dance theatre company in Adelaide, South Australia, until she was admitted to the National Institute of Dramatic Art in Sydney. She graduated from NIDA in 1985.

In 1992, McDonnell played the role of Kelly in the 1992 ABC police drama series Phoenix—a role for which she was nominated for an AFI Award for Best Performance by an Actress in a Leading Role in a Television Drama. She played a different role, Detective Sergeant Jan Murray, in Janus, a spin-off of Phoenix. Other television credits include the television series Halfway Across the Galaxy and Turn Left, The Secret Life of Us, Horace & Tina and The Saddle Club; and the mini-series The Dirtwater Dynasty, Come In Spinner and Simone de Beauvoir's Babies. Her film appearances included roles in Oscar and Lucinda (1997) and The Interview (1998).

In 2008, McDonnell played the leading role of Detective Inspector Gina Sturrock in the feature film Four of a Kind, a film which she was also the Associate Producer on.

McDonnell died on 15 March 2013, aged 49, after a year-long battle with cancer.

A documentary about her life and death, called All In Her Stride, was completed in 2014, with McDonnell as a co-producer.

References

External links

1963 births
2013 deaths
Australian television actresses
Australian film actresses
National Institute of Dramatic Art alumni
Deaths from cancer in Victoria (Australia)
Place of birth missing
Place of death missing